The 2023 South Alabama Jaguars football team represented the University of South Alabama as a member of the Sun Belt Conference during the 2023 NCAA Division I FBS football season. They were led by head coach Kane Wommack, who is coaching his third season with the team. The Jaguars played their home games at Hancock Whitney Stadium in Mobile, Alabama.

Previous season

The Jaguars finished the 2022 season 10–3, 7–1 in Sun Belt play to finish in second in the west division. They played Western Kentucky in New Orleans Bowl losing 44–23.

Schedule
The football schedule was announced February 24, 2023.

References

South Alabama
South Alabama Jaguars football seasons
South Alabama Jaguars football